The Gatlinburg Convention Center is a convention complex located in Gatlinburg, Tennessee, United States.

The complex was recently renovated by Johnson and Galyon.

References 

Convention centers in Tennessee